Polygamy is legal in Mali and frequently practiced. Malian immigrants to western nations such as France have encountered handfuls of problems based on such unions, and sparked political debate in France to bring about tougher laws against polygamy.

References

Society of Mali
Mali